Khadija Abbouda (born June 14, 1968) is an athlete from Morocco who competes in archery.

At the 2008 Summer Olympics in Beijing Abbouda finished her ranking round with a total of 539 points. This gave her the 64th seed for the final competition bracket in which she faced first seed Park Sung-hyun in the first round. The archer from South Korea was too strong and won the confrontation with 112-80, eliminating Abbouda straight away. Park would eventually go on to win the silver medal.

References

1968 births
Living people
Olympic archers of Morocco
Archers at the 2008 Summer Olympics
Moroccan female archers